The Bhakti movement was a significant religious movement in medieval Hinduism that sought to bring religious reforms to all strata of society by adopting the method of devotion to achieve salvation. Originating in Tamilakam during 6th century CE, it gained prominence through the poems and teachings of the Vaishnava Alvars and Shaiva Nayanars before spreading northwards. It swept over east and north India from the 15th century onwards, reaching its zenith between the 15th and 17th century CE.

The Bhakti movement regionally developed around different gods and goddesses, and some sub-sects were Shaivism (Shiva), Vaishnavism (Vishnu), Shaktism (Shakti goddesses), and Smartism. Bhakti movement preached using the local languages so that the message reached the masses. The movement was inspired by many poet-saints, who championed a wide range of philosophical positions ranging from theistic dualism of Dvaita to absolute monism of Advaita Vedanta.

The movement has traditionally been considered an influential social reformation in Hinduism in that it provided an individual-focused alternative path to spirituality regardless of one's birth or gender. Contemporary scholars question whether the Bhakti movement ever was a reform or rebellion of any kind. They suggest the Bhakti movement was a revival, reworking, and recontextualization of ancient Vedic traditions. Bhakti refers to deep devotion (to a deity).

Scriptures of the Bhakti movement include the Bhagavad Gita, Bhagavata Purana and Padma Purana.

Terminology 
The Sanskrit word bhakti is derived from the root , which means "divide, share, partake, participate, to belong to". The word also means "attachment, devotion to, fondness for, homage, faith or love, worship, piety to something as a spiritual, religious principle or means of salvation".

The meaning of the term Bhakti is analogous to but different from Kama. The Kama connotes emotional connection, sometimes with sensual devotion and erotic love. Bhakti, in contrast, is spiritual, a love and devotion to religious concepts or principles, that engages both emotion and intellection. Karen Pechelis states that the word Bhakti should not be understood as uncritical emotion, but as committed engagement. Bhakti movement in Hinduism refers to ideas and engagement that emerged in the medieval era on love and devotion to religious concepts built around one or more gods and goddesses. Bhakti movement preached against the caste system using the local languages so that the message reached the masses. One who practices bhakti is called a bhakta.

Textual roots 
Ancient Indian texts, dated to be from the 1st millennium BCE, such as the Shvetashvatara Upanishad, the Katha Upanishad, and the Bhagavad Gita mention Bhakti.

Shvetashvatara Upanishad 

The last of three epilogue verses of the Shvetashvatara Upanishad, 6.23, uses the word Bhakti as follows,

This verse is notable for the use of the word Bhakti, and has been widely cited as among the earliest mentions of "the love of God". Scholars have debated whether this phrase is authentic or later insertion into the Upanishad, and whether the terms "Bhakti" and "God" meant the same in this ancient text as they do in the medieval and modern era Bhakti traditions found in India. Max Muller states that the word Bhakti appears only in one last verse of the epilogue, could have been a later insertion and may not be theistic as the word was later used in much Sandilya Sutras. Grierson, as well as Carus, note that the first epilogue verse 6.21 is also notable for its use of the word Deva Prasada (देवप्रसाद, grace or gift of God), but add that Deva in the epilogue of the Shvetashvatara Upanishad refers to "pantheistic Brahman" and the closing credit to sage Shvetashvatara in verse 6.21 can mean "gift or grace of his Soul".

Doris Srinivasan states that the Upanishad is a treatise on theism, but it creatively embeds a variety of divine images, an inclusive language that allows "three Vedic definitions for a personal deity". The Upanishad includes verses wherein God can be identified with the Supreme (Brahman-Atman, Self, Soul) in Vedanta monistic theosophy, verses that support the dualistic view of Samkhya doctrines, as well as the synthetic novelty of triple Brahman where a triune exists as the divine soul (Isvara, theistic God), individual soul (self) and nature (Prakrti, matter). Tsuchida writes that the Upanishad syncretically combines monistic ideas in Upanishad and self-development ideas in Yoga with personification of Shiva-Rudra deity. Hiriyanna interprets the text to be introducing "personal theism" in the form of Shiva Bhakti, with a shift to monotheism but in the henotheistic context where the individual is encouraged to discover his own definition and sense of God.

Bhagavad Gita 
The Bhagavad Gita, a post-Vedic scripture composed in 5th to 2nd century BCE, introduces bhakti marga (the path of faith/devotion) as one of three ways to spiritual freedom and release, the other two being karma marga (the path of works) and jnana marga (the path of knowledge). In verses 6.31 through 6.47 of the Bhagavad Gita, Krishna (Incarnation of Vishnu), the source of everything, describes bhakti yoga and loving devotion, as one of the several paths to the highest spiritual attainments. According to Sri Krishna, Bhakti yoga is one of the sweetest path to know the "self" and to reach to the ultimate truth. Among activities of Bhakti yoga, hearing and chanting the glories of the deities are most important. According to conclusion of all the revealed scriptures, by constantly chanting the holy names of the Lord Krishna, Lord Shiva and Devi or Adi Para Shakti (in their any form) one can achieve all perfection, even in this Dark Age of Kali. Therefore, one should constantly chant the Hare Krishna Mahamantra,  - Hare Krishna Hare Krishna Krishna Krishna Hare Hare, Hare Rama Hare Rama Rama Rama Hare Hare. A shiva devotee can chant " Om Namah Shivaya". A devotee of Mother Goddess or Devi can chant various Mantras or chant attached to Devi.  One should accept a genuine spiritual master (Guru), and under him or her constantly practice the activities of Bhakti yoga to achieve the highest perfection of life. The Supreme Bramhan is most merciful.

Sutras 
Shandilya and Narada are credited with two Bhakti texts, the Shandilya Bhakti Sutra and Narada Bhakti Sutra.

History 

The Bhakti movement originated in South India during the seventh to eighth century CE, spread northwards from Tamil Nadu through Karnataka and gained wide acceptance in fifteenth-century Assam, Bengal and northern India.

The movement started with the Shaiva Nayanars and the Vaishnava Alvars, who lived between 5th and 9th century CE. Their efforts ultimately helped spread bhakti poetry and ideas throughout India by the 12th–18th century CE.

Bhakti movement in Odisha known as Jnana Misrita bhakti or Dadhya Bhakti which started in the 12th century by various scholars including Jayadeva and it was in the form of mass movement in the 14th century. The Panchasakha Balarama Dasa, Achyutananda, Jasobanta Dasa, Ananta Dasa and Jagannatha Dasa (Odia poet) preaching Bhakti by doing mass sankritana across the Odisha before Chaitanya's arrival. Jagannath is the center of the Odisha bhakti movement.

The Alvars, which literally means "those immersed in God", were Vaishnava poet-saints who sang praises of Vishnu as they traveled from one place to another. They established temple sites such as Srirangam, and spread ideas about Vaishnavism. Various poems were compiled as Alvar Arulicheyalgal or Divya Prabhandham, developed into an influential scripture for the Vaishnavas. The Bhagavata Purana's references to the South Indian Alvar saints, along with its emphasis on bhakti, have led many scholars to give it South Indian origins, though some scholars question whether this evidence excludes the possibility that bhakti movement had parallel developments in other parts of India.

Like the Alvars, the Saiva Nayanar poets were influential. The Tirumurai, a compilation of hymns on Shiva by sixty-three Nayanar poet-saints, developed into an influential scripture in Shaivism. The poets' itinerant lifestyle helped create temple and pilgrimage sites and spread spiritual ideas built around Shiva. Early Tamil-Siva bhakti poets influenced Hindu texts that came to be revered all over India.

Some scholars state that the Bhakti movement's rapid spread in India in the 2nd millennium was in part a response to the arrival of Islam and subsequent Islamic rule in India and Hindu-Muslim conflicts. This view is contested by some scholars, with Rekha Pande stating that singing ecstatic bhakti hymns in local language was a tradition in south India before Muhammad was born. According to Pande, the psychological impact of Muslim conquest may have initially contributed to community-style bhakti by Hindus. Yet other scholars state that Muslim invasions, their conquering of Hindu Bhakti temples in south India and seizure/melting of musical instruments such as cymbals from local people, was in part responsible for the later relocation or demise of singing Bhakti traditions in the 18th century.

According to Wendy Doniger, the nature of Bhakti movement may have been affected by the "surrender to God" daily practices of Islam when it arrived in India. In turn it influenced devotional practices in Islam such as Sufism, and other religions in India from the 15th century onwards, such as Sikhism, Christianity, and Jainism.

Klaus Witz, in contrast, traces the history and nature of the Bhakti movement to the Upanishadic and the Vedanta foundations of Hinduism. He writes, that in virtually every Bhakti movement poet, "the Upanishadic teachings form an all-pervasive substratum, if not a basis. We have here a state of affairs that has no parallel in the West. Supreme Wisdom, which can be taken as basically non-theistic and as an independent wisdom tradition (not dependent on the Vedas), appears fused with the highest level of bhakti and with the highest level of God-realization."

Poets, writers and musicians 

The Bhakti movement witnessed a surge in Hindu literature in regional languages, particularly in the form of devotional poems and music. This literature includes the writings of the Alvars and Nayanars, poems of Andal, Basava, Bhagat Pipa, Allama Prabhu, Akka Mahadevi, Kabir, Guru Nanak (founder of Sikhism), Tulsidas, Nabha Dass, Gusainji, Ghananand, Ramananda (founder of Ramanandi Sampradaya), Ravidass, Sripadaraja, Vyasatirtha, Purandara Dasa, Kanakadasa, Vijaya Dasa, Six Goswamis of Vrindavan, Raskhan, Ravidas, Jayadeva Goswami, Namdev, Eknath, Tukaram, Mirabai, Ramprasad Sen, Sankardev, Vallabha Acharya, Narsinh Mehta, Gangasati and the teachings of saints like Chaitanya Mahaprabhu.

The writings of Sankaradeva in Assam however, not only included an emphasis on the regional language, but also led to the development of an artificial literary language called Brajavali. Brajavali is to an extent, a combination of medieval Maithili and Assamese. The language was easily understood by the local populace, in line with the Bhakti movement's call for inclusion, but it also retained its literary style. A similar language, called Brajabuli was popularised by Vidyapati, which was adopted by several writers in Odisha in the medieval times, and in Bengal during its renaissance.

The earliest writers from the 7th to 10th century CE known to have influenced the poet-saints driven movements include, Sambandar, Tirunavukkarasar, Sundarar, Nammalvar, Adi Shankara, Manikkavacakar and Nathamuni. Several 11th and 12th century writers developed different philosophies within the Vedanta school of Hinduism, which were influential to the Bhakti tradition in medieval India. These include Ramanuja, Madhva, Vallabha and Nimbarka. These writers championed a spectrum of philosophical positions ranging from theistic dualism, qualified nondualism and absolute monism.

The Bhakti movement also witnessed several works getting translated into various Indian languages. Saundarya Lahari, written in Sanskrit by Adi Shankara, was translated into Tamil in the 12th century by Virai Kaviraja Pandithar, who titled the book Abhirami Paadal. Similarly, the first translation of the Ramayana into an Indo-Aryan language was by Madhava Kandali, who translated it into Assamese as the Saptakanda Ramayana.

Philosophy: Nirguna and Saguna Brahman 
The Bhakti movement of Hinduism saw two ways of imaging the nature of the divine (Brahman) – Nirguna and Saguna. Nirguna Brahman was the concept of the Ultimate Reality as formless, without attributes or quality. Saguna Brahman, in contrast, was envisioned and developed as with form, attributes and quality. The two had parallels in the ancient pantheistic unmanifest and theistic manifest traditions, respectively, and traceable to Arjuna-Krishna dialogue in the Bhagavad Gita. It is the same Brahman, but viewed from two perspectives, one from Nirguni knowledge-focus and other from Saguni love-focus, united as Krishna in the Gita. Nirguna bhakta's poetry were Jnana-shrayi, or had roots in knowledge. Saguna bhakta's poetry were Prema-shrayi, or with roots in love. In Bhakti, the emphasis is reciprocal love and devotion, where the devotee loves God, and God loves the devotee.

Jeaneane Fowler states that the concepts of Nirguna and Saguna Brahman, at the root of Bhakti movement theosophy, underwent more profound development with the ideas of Vedanta school of Hinduism, particularly those of Adi Shankara's Advaita Vedanta, Ramanuja's Vishishtadvaita Vedanta, and Madhvacharya's Dvaita Vedanta.  Two 12th-century influential treatises on bhakti were Sandilya Bhakti Sutra – a treatise resonating with Nirguna-bhakti, and Narada Bhakti Sutra – a treatise that leans towards Saguna-bhakti.

Nirguna and Saguna Brahman concepts of the Bhakti movement has been a baffling one to scholars, particularly the Nirguni tradition because it offers, states David Lorenzen, "heart-felt devotion to a God without attributes, without even any definable personality". Yet given the "mountains of Nirguni bhakti literature", adds Lorenzen, bhakti for Nirguna Brahman has been a part of the reality of the Hindu tradition along with the bhakti for Saguna Brahman. These were two alternate ways of imagining God during the bhakti movement.

Social impact 

The Bhakti movement led to devotional transformation of medieval Hindu society, wherein Vedic rituals or alternatively ascetic monk-like lifestyle for moksha gave way to individualistic loving relationship with a personally defined god. Salvation which was previously considered attainable only by men of Brahmin, Kshatriya and Vaishya castes, became available to everyone. Most scholars state that Bhakti movement provided women and members of the Shudra and untouchable communities an inclusive path to spiritual salvation. Some scholars disagree that the Bhakti movement was premised on such social inequalities.

Poet-saints grew in popularity, and literature on devotional songs in regional languages became profuse. These poet-saints championed a wide range of philosophical positions within their society, ranging from the theistic dualism of Dvaita to the absolute monism of Advaita Vedanta. Kabir, a poet-saint for example, wrote in Upanishadic style, the state of knowing truth:

The early 15th-century Bhakti poet-Sant Pipa stated,

The Bhakti movement also led to the prominence of the concept of female devotion, of poet-saints such as Andal coming to occupy the popular imagination of the common people along with her male counterparts. Andal went a step further by composing hymns in praise of God in vernacular Tamil rather than Sanskrit, in verses known as the Nachiyar Tirumoli, or the Woman's Sacred Verses:

The impact of the Bhakti movement in India was similar to that of the Protestant Reformation of Christianity in Europe. It evoked shared religiosity, direct emotional and intellection of the divine, and the pursuit of spiritual ideas without the overhead of institutional superstructures.  Practices emerged bringing new forms of spiritual leadership and social cohesion among the medieval Hindus, such as community singing, chanting together of deity names, festivals, pilgrimages, rituals relating to Saivism, Vaishnavism and Shaktism. Many of these regional practices have survived into the modern era.

Seva, dāna, and community kitchens 

The Bhakti movement introduced new forms of voluntary social giving such as Seva (service, for example to a temple or guru school or community construction), dāna (charity), and community kitchens with free shared food. Of community kitchen concepts, the vegetarian Guru ka Langar introduced by Nanak became a well-established institution over time, starting with northwest India, and expanding to everywhere Sikh communities are found. Other saints such as Dadu Dayal championed the similar social movement, a community that believed in Ahimsa (non-violence) towards all living beings, social equality, and vegetarian kitchen, as well as mutual social service concepts. Bhakti temples and matha (Hindu monasteries) of India adopted social functions such as relief to victims after a natural disaster, helping the poor and marginal farmers, providing community labor, feeding houses for the poor, free hostels for poor children and promoting folk culture.

Sikhism, Shakti, and Bhakti movement 
Some scholars call Sikhism a Bhakti sect of Indian traditions. In Sikhism, "nirguni Bhakti" is emphasised – devotion to a divine without Gunas (qualities or form), but it accepts both nirguni and saguni forms of the divine.

The Guru Granth Sahib, the scripture of the Sikhs, contains the hymns of the Sikh gurus, thirteen Hindu bhagats, and two Muslim bhagats. Some of the bhagats whose hymns were included in the Guru Granth Sahib, were bhakti poets who taught their ideas before the birth of Guru Nanak – the first of Sikh Guru. The thirteen Hindu bhagats whose hymns were entered into the text, were poet saints of the Bhakti movement, and included Namdev, Pipa, Ravidas, Beni, Bhikhan, Dhanna, Jayadeva, Parmanand, Sadhana, Sain, Surdas, Trilochan, while the two Muslim bhagats were Kabir and Sufi saint Farid. Most of the 5,894 hymns in the Sikh scripture came from the Sikh gurus, and rest from the Bhagats. The three highest contributions in the Sikh scripture of non-Sikh bhagats were from Bhagat Kabir (292 hymns), Bhagat Farid (134 hymns), and Bhagat Namdev (60 hymns).

While Sikhism was influenced by Bhakti movement, and incorporated hymns from the Bhakti poet-saints, it was not simply an extension of the Bhakti movement. Sikhism, for instance, disagreed with some of the views of Bhakti saints Kabir and Ravidas.

Guru Nanak, the first Sikh Guru and the founder of Sikhism, was a Bhakti saint. He taught, states Jon Mayled, that the most important form of worship is Bhakti. Nam-simran – the realisation of God – is an important Bhakti practice in Sikhism. Guru Arjan, in his Sukhmani Sahib, recommended the true religion is one of loving devotion to God. The Sikh scripture Guru Granth Sahib includes suggestions for a Sikh to perform constant Bhakti. The Bhakti themes in Sikhism also incorporate Shakti (power) ideas.

Some Sikh sects outside the Punjab-region of India, such as those found in Maharashtra and Bihar, practice Aarti with lamps in a Gurdwara. Arti and devotional prayer ceremonies are also found in Ravidassia sect, previously part of Sikhism.

Buddhism, Jainism, and Bhakti movement 
Bhakti has been a prevalent practice in various Jaina sects, wherein learned Tirthankara (Jina) and human gurus are considered superior beings and venerated with offerings, songs and Āratī prayers. John Cort suggests that the bhakti movement in later Hinduism and Jainism may share roots in vandal and puja concepts of the Jaina tradition.

Medieval-era bhakti traditions among non-theistic Indian traditions such as Buddhism and Jainism have been reported by scholars, wherein the devotion and prayer ceremonies were dedicated to an enlightened guru, primarily Buddha and Jina Mahavira respectively, as well as others. Karel Werner notes that Bhatti (Bhakti in Pali) has been a significant practice in Theravada Buddhism, and states, "there can be no doubt that deep devotion or bhakti / Bhatti does exist in Buddhism and that it had its beginnings in the earliest days".

Debates in contemporary scholarship 
Contemporary scholars question whether the 19th- and early 20th-century theories about the Bhakti movement in India, its origin, nature, and history are accurate. Pechilis in her book on Bhakti movement, for example, states:

Madeleine Biardeau states, as does Jeanine Miller, that Bhakti movement was neither reform nor a sudden innovation, but the continuation and expression of ideas to be found in Vedas, Bhakti Marga teachings of the Bhagavad Gita, the Katha Upanishad and the Shvetashvatara Upanishad.

John Stratton Hawley describes recent scholarship which questions the old theory of Bhakti movement origin and "story of south-moves-north", then states that the movement had multiple origins, mentioning Brindavan in north India as another center. Hawley describes the controversy and disagreements between Indian scholars, quotes Hegde's concern that "Bhakti movement was a reform" theory has been supported by "cherry-picking particular songs from a large corpus of Bhakti literature" and that if the entirety of the literature by any single author such as Basava is considered along with its historical context, there is neither reform nor a need for reform. 

Sheldon Pollock writes that the Bhakti movement was neither a rebellion against Brahmins and the upper castes nor a rebellion against the Sanskrit language, because many of the prominent thinkers and earliest champions of the Bhakti movement were Brahmins and from upper castes, and because much of the early and later Bhakti poetry and literature was in Sanskrit. Further, states Pollock, evidence of Bhakti trends in ancient southeast Asian Hinduism in the 1st millennium CE, such as those in Cambodia and Indonesia where Vedic era is unknown, and where upper caste Tamil Hindu nobility and merchants introduced Bhakti ideas of Hinduism, suggest the roots and the nature of Bhakti movement be primarily spiritual and political quest instead of the rebellion of some form.

John Guy states that the evidence of Hindu temples and Chinese inscriptions from the 8th century CE about Tamil merchants, presents Bhakti motifs in Chinese trading towns, particularly the Kaiyuan Temple (Quanzhou). These show Saivite, Vaishnavite and Hindu Brahmin monasteries revered Bhakti themes in China.

Scholars increasingly are dropping, states Karen Pechilis, the old premises and the language of "radical otherness, monotheism and reform of orthodoxy" for Bhakti movement.  Many scholars are now characterizing the emergence of Bhakti in medieval India as a revival, reworking, and recontextualization of the central themes of the Vedic traditions.

See also 

 A. C. Bhaktivedanta Swami Prabhupada
 Achintya Bheda Abheda
 Buddhist devotion
 Bhatti Puja in Theravada Buddhism
 Devotional movements
 Ekasarana Dharma
 Nama sankeerthanam
 Puja (Buddhism)
 Puja (Hinduism)
 Ravidassia religion
 Shaiva Siddhanta
Sahajanand Swami
 Yidam

Notes

References 
Citations

Bibliography

Further reading 
 Kishwar, Madhu (1989). Women Bhakta Poets: Manushi. Manushi Publications. ASIN B001RPVZVU.

External links 

 Bhakti bibliography, Harvard University Archive (2001)
 Definition of Bhakti, Swami Vivekananda, Wikisource
 George Spencer (1970), "The Sacred Geography of the Tamil Shaivite Hymns", Numen, Vol. 17, Fasc. 3, pages 232–244
  Glenn Yocum (1973), "Shrines, Shamanism, and Love Poetry: Elements in the Emergence of Popular Tamil Bhakti", Journal of the American Academy of Religion, Vol. 41, No. 1, pages 3–17
 SM Pandey (1965), "Mīrābāī and Her Contributions to the Bhakti Movement", History of Religions, Vol. 5, No. 1, pages 54–73
 Vijay Pinch (May 2003), "Bhakti and the British Empire", Past & Present, No. 179, pages 159–196
  John Hawley (1984), "The Music in Faith and Morality", Journal of the American Academy of Religion, Vol. 52, No. 2, pages 243–262
 John Hawley (1988), "Author and Authority in the Bhakti Poetry of North India", The Journal of Asian Studies, Vol. 47, No. 2, pages 269–290
 Karen Pechilis (2015), "Female Gurus and Ascetics", Karen Pechilis (2015), Brill's Encyclopedia of Hinduism. Edited by: Knut Jacobsen et al. (Requires subscription)
 

 
Anti-caste movements
Hindu movements